Clinton D. Owlett is a Republican member of the Pennsylvania House of Representatives. He was elected from the 68th district on June 5, 2018.

Early life and family 
Owlett grew up on a dairy farm in Tioga County, Pennsylvania and attended New Covenant Academy. After graduating high school, Owlett completed an internship at Three Springs Ministries.  There, he advanced to the position of director of program development and then general manager, before leaving to work at a ski resort. In 2012, he established his own construction and decorating company.

He is married to Lauren Owlett. They have four children.

Political views 
During the COVID-19 pandemic, Owlett introduced legislation that would allow religious institutions to gather in-person. He voted twice to lift the governor's emergency order, once on May 28, 2020, and again on June 9, 2020.

Owlett has amended laws on illegal drugs, introducing a bill to permanently place carfentanil on the list of Schedule II controlled substances. Furthermore, he has promoted legislators to co-sponsor laws that would make drug delivery that results in serious injury a felony.

Owlett supports the deregulation of small farms and the promotion of dairy products. He supports efforts to prohibit plant-based milk from using the term "milk", and advocates for schools to provide larger quantities of milk with school lunches.

Owlett supports two bills currently in the Pennsylvania Legislature that would restrict abortion. One of the bills, a heartbeat bill, would bar women from undergoing an abortion after a fetal heartbeat is detected. The second bill, known as the Down Syndrome Protection Act, would prohibit abortions based on a prenatal Down syndrome diagnosis.

Owlett currently sits on the Agriculture & Rural Affairs Appropriations, Subcommittee on Health and Welfare, Committee On Ethics, Health, and State Government committees.

References 

Republican Party members of the Pennsylvania House of Representatives
21st-century American politicians
People from Tioga County, Pennsylvania
Year of birth missing (living people)
Living people